Daniel Pule Kunene (1923-2016) was a South African literary scholar, translator and writer. He was Emeritus Professor of African Languages and Literature at the University of Wisconsin-Madison.<ref>Daniel Kunene, South African History Online. Accessed August 26, 2020.</ref>

Life
Daniel Kunene was born on April 13, 1923 in Edenville, South Africa. He gained a BA in 1949 from the University of South Africa, an MA in 1951 from the University of Cape Town and a PhD in 1961 from the University of Cape Town. He married Selina Sekhuthe in 1953. In 1963 he and his family left South Africa, finding political asylum in the United
States after a stay in London.

Kunene taught at UW Madison for 33 years. He also taught at the University of Cape Town, the University of London, the University of California, Los Angeles, and the Johannes Gutenberg University of Mainz.

In summer 1993 Kunene toured South Africa, his first chance to return after three decades of exile. His wife Selina died in October 1993. In 2003 he married again, to Marci Ellis. He died on May 27, 2016.

Works
 Dithoko, dithothokiso le dithoholetso tsa sesotho. Cape Town: Oxford University Press, 1966.
 The works of Thomas Mofolo : summaries and critiques : a forerunner of A digest of African vernacular literatures, 1967
 The beginning of South African vernacular literature: A historical study. 
 Heroic poetry of the Basotho, 1971
 Pirates have become our kings: poems. Nairobi, Kenya : East African Pub. House, 1978.
 The ideophone in Southern Sotho, Berlin: Reimer, 1978.
 (tr.) Chaka by Thomas Mofolo. 1980.
 A seed must seem to die, 1981
 From the pit of Hell to the spring of life, 1984
 Thomas Mofolo and the emergence of written Sesotho prose, 1989
 The Zulu novels of C.L.S. Nyembezi : a critical appraisal''. Lewiston, N.Y.: Edwin Mellen Press, 2007.

References

1923 births
2016 deaths
University of South Africa alumni
University of Cape Town alumni
South African refugees
South African academics
South African poets
South African short story writers
South African translators
University of Wisconsin–Madison faculty
South African emigrants to the United States
Scholars of African literature
20th-century translators
South African expatriates in the United Kingdom